The Sandpiper is a 1965 American drama film directed by Vincente Minnelli and starring Elizabeth Taylor and Richard Burton.

Plot
Laura Reynolds is a free-spirited, unwed single mother living with her young son Danny in an isolated beach house in Big Sur, California.  She makes a modest living as an artist and homeschools her son out of concern that he will be compelled to follow stifling conventional social norms in a regular school.  Danny has gotten into some trouble with the law through two incidents, one of indecently touching a girl his age, and a third incident, the shooting of a fawn to see whether its a fun thing to do.  In his mother's eyes these things are innocent expressions of his natural curiosity and conscience rather than delinquency.

The judge orders her to send the boy to an Episcopal boarding school where Dr. Edward Hewitt is headmaster and his wife Claire teaches, or the judge will send Danny to reform school. Edward and Claire are happily married with two student sons boarding away from home at a college-preparatory school, but their life has become routine and their youthful idealism has been tamed by the need to raise funds for the school and please wealthy benefactors.

At an initial interview, there is a fleeting attraction between Laura and Edward, but this quickly turns into tension brought on by their greatly differing world views and Laura's dislike of religion.  Finally she storms out.  She attempts to flee the area with Danny but the police quickly catch them and take the boy away to the school.  He has trouble fitting in because his mother's homeschooling has placed him far in advance of boys his age in many subjects; the standard course of instruction at the school leaves him restless and bored.  At Claire's suggestion, Edward visits Danny's mother to learn more about his upbringing.

Laura's unconventional morals disturb Edward because they conflict with his religious beliefs. After visiting her several more times he finds her irresistible and cannot get her out of his mind. They begin a passionate affair. Laura tells herself that Edward is a fling like her other lovers, but to her surprise she finds herself falling in love with him, becoming jealous of his wife Claire. He struggles with guilt, while she urges him to accept their love. Meanwhile, Danny flourishes after Edward relaxes school rules and allows the boy to choose more advanced classes.

Ward Hendricks, a jealous former lover of Laura, who had paid for her two years of art studies in exchange for her being his mistress, exposes the affair by making a remark to Edward within earshot of his wife. At first Claire is distraught, but later they quietly discuss it in the light of how their lives diverged from the idealism of the early years of their marriage. Edward declares that he still loves Claire and that he will end the affair. Still, they agree to a temporary separation while each decides what they want to do.

When Edward tells Laura that he confessed to his wife, she is outraged at what she perceives as an invasion of her privacy, and they part angrily. The school year over, Laura tells Danny that they can move away, but he has put down roots at the school and wants to stay there. His mother has a moment of pain but realizes Danny's need to be independent and agrees. Danny asks Laura to come to a church event to hear him and the choir sing. She is uncomfortable being at the church or near Edward and Claire, but because she loves Danny and wants to support him, she agrees. During the service, Edward resigns his position at the school and the church. In his resignation speech, he mentions some of the things he'll miss and although they sound generic, they are things he and Laura shared. Tears fill her eyes. After the service, Edward sees Laura and tells her he will  be leaving the area and traveling down the coast. As a parting gift, Edward has arranged for Danny to attend school tuition-free. All Laura can do is look at Edward with tears in her eyes. On Edward's way out of town, he stops at Laura's place for a silent farewell. She and Danny are down on the beach. Edward up on the bluff looks down at them. Laura turns from her painting, looks up and smiles, then he turns and walks away.

Cast
 Elizabeth Taylor as Laura Reynolds
 Richard Burton as Dr. Edward Hewitt
 Eva Marie Saint as Claire Hewitt
 Charles Bronson as Cos Erickson
 Robert Webber as Ward Hendricks
 James Edwards as Larry Brant
 Torin Thatcher as Judge Thompson
 Tom Drake as Walter Robinson
 Douglas Henderson as Paul Sutcliff
 Morgan Mason as Danny Reynolds

Production
The film was originally written for Kim Novak.

Title
The character Laura Reynolds nurses a sandpiper with a broken wing, as Edward Hewitt looks on.  The bird lives in her home until it is healed and then flies free, though it comes back occasionally.  This sandpiper is used as a central symbol in the movie, illustrating the themes of growth and freedom.

Location
The Sandpiper is one of the very few major studio pictures ever filmed in Big Sur, and the story is specifically set there. The film includes many location shots of Big Sur landmarks, including Pfeiffer Beach, Point Lobos State Reserve, Bixby Creek Bridge, the Coast Gallery (where Laura exhibits her artwork), and the restaurant Nepenthe.

Theme
The theme music for the film was "The Shadow of Your Smile", by Johnny Mandel, with lyrics by Paul Francis Webster. It was sung by an uncredited choral group, and the tune was used throughout the film, featuring the trumpet of Jack Sheldon. It won the 1965 Academy Award for Best Original Song, and a recording by Tony Bennett won the 1966 Grammy Award for Song of the Year.

Nudity
Taylor was filmed topless for the film but the scene was cut prior to the film's release.

Real-life parallels
The film was released at the height of Taylor and Burton's fame. It capitalized on their celebrity as one of the world's most famous couples and their well-known romantic adventures. Although they portrayed adulterous lovers, they were married on March 15, 1964, shortly before filming began. The film's theme of adultery closely mirrored their own personal lives at the time, as Taylor very publicly conducted an affair with Burton while married to Eddie Fisher, and Burton had done the same while married to Welsh actress Sybil Williams.

Home media
The DVD, released in 2006, includes two short films the filmmakers shot along with the movie, one about Big Sur and its artist colony, featuring narration by Burton, and another about the bust of Elizabeth Taylor that was commissioned from a Big Sur artist for use as a prop in the movie.

Paperback novelization
Pocket Books published a novelization of the screenplay by Robert Hemenway, who would continue to write fiction and would later become a renowned American educator and biographer. The Sandpiper was his sole media tie-in book.

Reception
The film received negative reviews from critics. On Rotten Tomatoes, the film holds a rating of 21% based on 28 reviews.

By 1976 Variety estimated the film had earned $7 million in theatrical rentals in North America.

Awards and nominations

The film is recognized by American Film Institute in these lists:
 2004: AFI's 100 Years...100 Songs:
 "The Shadow of Your Smile" – #77
 2005: AFI's 100 Years of Film Scores – Nominated

See also
 List of American films of 1965

References

External links
 
 
 
 The Sandpiper at Turner Classic Movies 
 The Sandpiper film trailer at Turner Classic Movies Media Room
 The Sandpiper featurette at Turner Classic Movies Media Room (making of the film)
 
 
 Big Sur and the Sandpiper informational article

1965 films
1965 drama films
Films scored by Johnny Mandel
Films directed by Vincente Minnelli
Films set in California
Films shot in California
Films that won the Best Original Song Academy Award
Metro-Goldwyn-Mayer films
Films with screenplays by Dalton Trumbo
Films with screenplays by Michael Wilson (writer)
Big Sur
Adultery in films
Filmways films
1960s English-language films
American drama films
1960s American films